Keshav Kumar Budhathoki is a Nepalese politician, belonging to the Nepali Congress. He was the Jhapa District President of Nepali Congress (Democratic). In April 2008, he won the Jhapa-5 seat in the Constituent Assembly election with 16466 votes.

He was inducted in the central working committee of Nepali Congress on February 25, 2012. He was appointed as zonal coordinator of sagarmatha region on April 28, 2013.

References

Year of birth missing (living people)
Living people
Nepali Congress politicians from Koshi Province
Members of the 1st Nepalese Constituent Assembly